The Bear Sanctuary Ninh Binh is located in Vietnam and was completed in December 2017 by Four Paws due to the production of bear bile and the illegal trade of bear products.

History and description 
With Bear Sanctuary Ninh Binh, Four Paws wants to end bear farming in Vietnam. The sanctuary allows the government the enforcement of existing laws prohibiting the abuse of bears for bile extraction by providing a place for any bears to be cared for.

The sanctuary is located in northern Vietnam. The first construction phase comprises 3,6 hectare with four natural, outdoor enclosures, two bear houses, a quarantine area and a veterinary clinic. Bear Sanctuary Ninh Binh will be expanded in two further construction phases to 10 hectare.

The sanctuary has species-appropriate habitats for up to 44 Asiatic Black Bears. The first three Asiatic black bears were rehomed in the sanctuary in November 2017. In January 2018, another Asiatic black bear was transferred to the sanctuary. In April 2018, the last two bile bears in the province of Ninh Binh were rescued and transferred to Bear Sanctuary Ninh Binh. At the end of the sanctuary’s development, the sanctuary will provide a species-appropriate home for approximately 100 former bile bears.

Bear Sanctuary Ninh Binh opened for visitors in January 2019. Different from other Four Paws sanctuaries, visitors can enter the whole sanctuary. A path will lead the visitors above some enclosures to allow visitors to observe the bears from a distance.

See also 
 Bear Sanctuary Prishtina
 Bear Sanctuary Domazhyr

External links
 Four Paws: project Bear Sanctuary Ninh Binh

References 

Ninh Binh
Parks in Vietnam